Loh language may refer to:
 the Lo-Toga language, an Oceanic language of Vanuatu – more specifically, the Lo dialect spoken on the island of Lo ( Loh)
 the Loo language, an Adamawa language of Nigeria